Hardeep Singh Kohli (born 21 January 1969) is a Scottish presenter of Sikh heritage who has appeared on various radio and television programmes.

Background
Kohli was born in London and moved to Glasgow, Scotland, when he was four. His parents came to Britain from India in the 1960s. The family's roots lie in the Punjab. His mother was a social worker, and his father a teacher who became a wealthy property landlord in the Bishopbriggs suburb. His first school was Hillhead Primary School in the West End of Glasgow, after which he attended Meadowburn Primary in Bishopbriggs.

At age eight, he moved to John Ogilvie Hall, the primary school of St Aloysius' College, a private Roman Catholic school in central Glasgow. Kohli studied Law at the University of Glasgow, graduating in 1990. While at university he worked in a vegetarian restaurant and worked as an usher at the Citizens Theatre.

Career

Television
After graduating from university Kohli joined the BBC Scotland graduate production trainee scheme. He later worked in BBC Television Centre, London, directing children's TV, before moving to Youth and Entertainment Features in Manchester to become a series director on Janet Street-Porter's series Reportage. He was a director of It'll Never Work, which was the first children's TV show to win an award from the Royal Television Society and BAFTA in its first season.

Kohli left the corporation in 1996 to work independently. He directed commercials and worked in TV development and broadcast occasionally on BBC Radio 5 Live.

He wrote, directed and starred in Channel 4's Meet the Magoons in 2004. The critical response was lukewarm and it failed to find an audience.  Thomas Sutcliffe said the first episode "went beyond desperate and started to sound as if the comedy was actually pleading for its life". He observed that "Kohli didn't have much to offer in the way of Indian flavour besides a ready-meal approach to comic insult."  The kinder reviewers listed here include Nancy Banks Smith who wrote it was "modern to the point of surreal" with A. A. Gill put forward a hope that it might "evolve into something classic" The show was entered for a Rose at the Montreux Comedy Festival but did not make the final list

In September 2006, Kohli took part in the first series of BBC One's Celebrity MasterChef programme, reaching the final along with Roger Black, finishing second to the ultimate winner, Matt Dawson.  In January 2007, he had a three-part series on Channel 4, £50 Says You'll Watch This.  The series was the first documentary exploring all forms of gambling.  The show involved Kohli taking part in a celebrity card game, visiting casinos in Las Vegas.  In October 2006, February 2007 and January 2009 he appeared on the BBC political panel programme Question Time, and was an occasional presenter on Newsnight Review, Saturday Live on BBC Radio 4 and Loose Ends.

In 2008 Kohli presented "New British Kitchen" a cookery series for UKTV with John Torode. That was followed by Kohli's solo show "Chefs and the City" for the same channel. He also appeared on Gordon Ramsay: Cook Along Live. He also participated in a celebrity edition of The Apprentice to raise money for charity. Sport Relief Does The Apprentice was part of the BBC's annual charity initiative Sport Relief and aired on 12 and 14 March 2008. He was the first Celebrity Apprentice to be "fired".

He appeared in the Scottish segment of the BBC's 2008 Children in Need appeal, anchored by Jackie Bird and Des Clarke.

Also in 2008, Kohli filmed a documentary about Scientology, mainly the so-called Free Zone, titled The Beginner's Guide to L. Ron Hubbard.  Kohli presented a documentary In Search of the Tartan Turban, which explored cultural identity as a Briton and a Scot belonging to an ethnic minority. The show won a Schools BAFTA. Channel 4 commissioning a five part series called "Hardeep Does..." that covered a variety of topical issues including sex, religion and pets. It was not renewed.

Kohli was the presenter of the second series of CBBC game show Get 100. In June 2009, he was one of five volunteers who took part in a BBC series of three programmes Famous, Rich and Homeless about living penniless on the streets of London.

Kohli has appeared as a panellist on The Wright Stuff on Channel Five. He occasionally hosted the programme when Matthew Wright (the host presenter) was on holiday or ill.

Kohli was a reporter for The One Show, but suspended in 2009 for six months amidst allegations of "inappropriate behaviour" towards a researcher. His contract was never renewed.

On 16 August 2018, Kohli entered the UK television show, Celebrity Big Brother as a celebrity housemate. Kohli was nominated four times for eviction while in the Celebrity Big Brother house, before he was finally eliminated on 7 September 2018. Kohli became the fifth housemate to be evicted.

Radio

Kohli wrote and presented BBC Radio 4's "Hippy Trail" described by the Telegraph's Gillian Reynolds as "he patently had no real interest in the European and American hippies who trekked overland to India in the 1960s. At times, he seemed positively contemptuous, as if he were wondering why he was bothering"
He also presented BBC Radio 4 commissions, "Where Scotland Meets England" and "Where England Meets Wales".

In 2010 Radio 2 broadcast "Great British Faith", a city based series looking at the spiritual life and history of six British cities. Described as "terrific" by Kohli's friend Elisabeth Mahoney in The Guardian she was "impressed by the depth and scope of their portraits. Kohli brought to the programmes a real sense of the spiritual textures of these urban landscapes."

Under producer Adam Fowler, he presented a BBC Radio 4 documentary 'The Loneliness of the Goalkeeper' won a prize in Illinois in 2010 as Third Coast Directors' Choice Award for Ladbroke Productions.

In 2011 Kohli presented a series about words and language "15 by 15" which took a Silver at the New York Radio Festival.

In 2012 Kohli recorded his first series of Hardeep’s Sunday Lunch, a programme that explores people's lives while Kohli cooks lunch. The sixth series was broadcast in the autumn of 2017 and early 2018.

In August 2013, Kohli presented his third edition of The Food Programme on Radio 4 "Ode to a Bacon Roll", about his fondness for bacon.

Journalism

From 2007 to 2009 Kohli wrote Hardeep is your Love, a column for Scotland on Sunday, He was twice put forward but unplaced as Columnist of the Year at the Scottish Press Awards.

Kohli occasionally writes for The Guardian, The Observer, GQ magazine, Metro, The Spectator and The Independent. As a feature writer for High Life Magazine for British Airways, he was nominated but unplaced in 2014 for the AITO Travel Writer of the Year.

From mid-2014 until the end of 2015 Kohli was the food writer at the Daily Record and wrote a short column for the Sunday Herald.

Kohli was co-founder of the Byline Festival of independent journalism.

Comedy

At the Edinburgh Festival Fringe In August 2009 Kohli performed his debut one-man show, The Nearly Naked Chef, the first live curry cooking comedy show ever.

2013 he did a short run of new material which became "Hardeep is Your Love" in 2014. The following year was "Bigmouth Strikes Again". In 2016 his love of music was the inspiration for "Mixtape: My Life Through Music". "The show needed more joke content, structure and general fleshing out to be complete. Perhaps if he could get through more than just three songs, that might help," said BroadwayBaby.

Literature

Kohli wrote a book about food and travel in India, Indian Takeaway (2008), described by The Guardian as 'likeable but clumsy'. Also in 2008, Kohli was a judge for the Man Booker Prize.

Creative

Hardeep was a board member of the National Theatre of Scotland. In 2017 Kohli became a Fellow of Royal Society of Arts, and  Creative Director at the Innovation Academy

Other 
Hardeep hosted the Brit Asia TV Music Awards on its debut in 2010 and on the following events in 2011 and 2012.

Personal life
Kohli is the father of two children. He was divorced in 2009. His younger brother is the actor and writer Sanjeev Kohli.
 
Kohli is also a landlord in Glasgow. This was much discussed when his properties were condemned by officials as "grubby and dirty" and substandard. He was warned about his conduct as a landlord.

On 25 March 2019, Kohli appeared at Glasgow Sheriff Court, where he admitted to driving without a licence on West Nile Street in Glasgow on 10 April 2018. Kohli's driving licence had been revoked in October 2017. The court heard Kohli had experienced tingling in his foot and went to the doctor to find out what was wrong. The doctor then wrote to the DVLA about his problem which meant his licence was cancelled. Kohli's defence lawyer Garvey McCardle said: "He was worried about his foot and he was experiencing pins and needles and he contacted his doctor. She was zealous in her approach and she told the DVLA that it led to numbness, he didn’t know she wrote to them". He was convicted and fined £180.

In 2020, Singh Kohli was accused of sexual harassment by multiple women, including some in the comedy industry. It was at a show where he approached a younger performer and offered to use his influence to boost her career. Lulu Popplewell alleged that an offer of help was accompanied by an invitation to spend the night in his bed and has accused Kohli of attempting to abuse his power. In response, Singh Kohli said: "It is now clear to me that my actions and words made women feel intimidated, undermined and undervalued. For this, I apologise unreservedly and can only hope to live a life of greater understanding."

Political views

Support for Scottish Independence
Kohli wrote and spoke in support of the campaign for a "Yes" vote in the 2014 referendum on Scottish independence, appearing at the rallies for Scottish independence on 22 September 2012 and on 21 September 2013 in Edinburgh.

Kohli returned to Scotland prior to the referendum in order to take a prominent role in the Yes Scotland campaign. Kohli joined the Scottish National Party in November 2014, following the "Yes" campaign's defeat at the independence referendum.

Television
 Celebrity Big Brother (2018)

References

External links

Hardeep Singh Kohli's official site

Meet the Magoons microsite at the Channel 4 website

1969 births
People educated at St Aloysius' College, Glasgow
Living people
Punjabi people
Scottish Sikhs
Scottish people of Indian descent
Scottish broadcasters
Scottish television presenters
Scottish radio presenters
People from Bishopbriggs
BBC television presenters
Alumni of the University of Glasgow
British male actors of Indian descent
Scottish television directors
British male journalists
Scottish food writers
Scottish male comedians
Scottish nationalists